Khalifeh Kandi-ye Hatam (also Romanized as Khalīfeh Kandī-ye Ḩātam; also known as Khalīfeh Kandī) is a village in Soluk Rural District, in the Central District of Hashtrud County, East Azerbaijan Province, Iran. At the 2006 census, its population was 228, in 45 families.

References 

Towns and villages in Hashtrud County